Edgar Berkeley Gifford, 4th Baron Gifford (8 March 1857 – 29 January 1937), was a British peer.

He was the son of Robert Gifford, 2nd Baron Gifford, and Hon. Swinburne Frederica Charlotte FitzHardinge Berkeley, daughter of Admiral Maurice Berkeley, 1st Baron FitzHardinge. He was educated at Lancing and was a Lieutenant in the South Gloucestershire Militia. He succeeded in the barony on 5 June 1911.

He married Anne Maud Aitchison, daughter of Lt.-Col. William Aitchison, 5 June 1918 and had issue:

 Hon. Serena Mary Gifford (born 30 September 1919).

He died on 29 January 1937 at age 79, without male issue, and was succeeded in the barony by his nephew.

Coat of arms

References

 http://www.thepeerage.com/p7939.htm

1857 births
1937 deaths
Barons in the Peerage of the United Kingdom
People educated at Lancing College
Younger sons of barons